The 2015 Honduran Supercup was a match arranged by the Honduran Liga Nacional which was scheduled to take place on 8 August 2015 between C.D. Motagua, winners of the 2014–15 Honduran Liga Nacional (Apertura) and C.D. Olimpia, winners of the 2015 Honduran Cup.  This would have been the third edition of the Honduran Supercup and the first one since 1999; however the match appears to have been abandoned with no disclosed reason.

The game

See also
 2015–16 Honduran Liga Nacional
 2015–16 Honduran Cup

References

Honduran Supercup
Supercup